The Emancipator may refer to:

Media
 The Emancipator (newspaper), American anti-slavery newspaper founded in 1833
 The Emancipator (website), American online newspaper founded in 2021
 Manumission Intelligencier, American anti-slavery newspaper later renamed The Emancipator

People
Abraham Lincoln, President of the United States
Daniel O'Connell (1775–1847), Irish nationalist politician who achieved Catholic emancipation in the United Kingdom

See also
Emancipation
Emancipator (musician)